Pherbellia ventralis is a species of fly in the family Sciomyzidae. It is found in the  Palearctic . The larvae feed on aquatic snails including Stagnicola palustris .

References

External links
Images representing Pherbellia ventralis at BOLD

Sciomyzidae
Insects described in 1820
Muscomorph flies of Europe